The Microcredit Summit Campaign, an American non-profit organization, started as an effort to bring together microcredit practitioners, advocates, educational institutions, donor agencies, international financial institutions, non-governmental organizations and others involved with microcredit around the goal of alleviating world poverty through microfinance.

History 

The first Microcredit Summit was held February 2–4, 1997 in Washington, DC.  The first summit had approximately 3,000 in attendance from 137 countries.  Hillary Clinton gave the keynote speech at the first Summit.

The outcome of the first Summit was the launch of a "campaign" to reach 100 million of the world's poorest families, especially the women of those families, with credit for self-employment and other financial and business services by the year 2005. In January 2009, to coincide with the release of the State of the Microcredit Summit Campaign Report 2009 (SOCR), the Microcredit Summit Campaign announced that over 100 million of the world's poorest families had received a microloan.

Approach

The Campaign was founded by Muhammad Yunus, Sam Daley-Harris, and John Hatch on a principle that emphasized a citizen-led approach of establishing and meeting a collective global goal. The Campaign represents more than a single organization and is a social movement that aims to advance the microfinance field and foster a productive learning community.

Microfinance access

By December 31, 2010, the Campaign counted more than 3,600 microfinance institutions that reported reaching more than 205 million clients with a current loan. Of these institutions in the developing world, 1,009 are in Sub-Saharan African, 1,746 are in Asia and the Pacific, 647 are in Latin America and the Caribbean with the remainder (250) in the Middle East and North Africa (MENA) and the industrialized regions of (1) North America and Western Europe and (2) Eastern Europe and Central Asia.

According to the State of the Microcredit Summit Campaign Report 2012, out of the total number of clients reached in 2010, 137.5 million were among the poorest and 82.3 percent (113.1 million) were women.

The growth in the number of very poor women reached has gone from 10.3 million at the end of 1999 to 113.1 million at the end of 2010. This is a 1,001 percent increase in the number of poorest women reached from December 31, 1999 to December 31, 2010. The increase represents an additional 109.9 million poorest women receiving microloans in the last 11 years.

Of the 137.5 million poorest clients, 122.5 million of them (89 percent) are being served by the 85 largest individual institutions and networks reporting to the Campaign, all with 100,000 or more poorest clients.

Survey methodology 
The Microcredit Summit Campaign has collected data for 14 years and began verifying that data in 2000.
The process of identifying access to microfinance consists of (1) the circulation of Institutional Action Plans (IAPs) to thousands of practitioners with a request for submission of their most recent data; (2) a phone campaign to hundreds of the largest MFIs in the world to encourage submission; (3) a verification process seeking third-party corroboration of the data submitted by the largest MFIs; (4) data compilation and analysis; and (5) the writing of the report.

Note: The data presented in the final report comes mainly from individual institutions and excludes network institutions to prevent double counting.

See also
 BRAC (NGO)
 Freedom from Hunger
 Grameen Bank

References

External links
 RESULTS: About the Microcredit Summit Campaign - Archival page about the Campaign
 Jamii Bora
 MFTransparency
 Orangi Pilot Project – Orangi Charitable Trust (OPP – OCT

Microfinance organizations
Banking in the United States
International development organizations
Poverty-related organizations
Non-profit organizations based in Washington, D.C.